Harri Hedgren (born 17 April 1959) is a Finnish former cyclist. He competed in the individual road race event at the 1984 Summer Olympics.

References

External links
 

1959 births
Living people
Finnish male cyclists
Olympic cyclists of Finland
Cyclists at the 1984 Summer Olympics
Sportspeople from Helsinki